Thiophosphoric acid is a chemical compound. Structurally, it is the acid derived from phosphoric acid with one extra sulfur atom, although it cannot be prepared from phosphoric acid.  It is a colorless compound that is rarely isolated in pure form, but rather as a solution.  The structure of the compound has not been reported, but two tautomers are reasonable: SP(OH)3 and OP(OH)2SH.

Preparation
The compound has been prepared in a multistep process starting with the base hydrolysis of phosphorus pentasulfide to give dithiophosphate, which is isolated as its barium salt:
P2S5  +  6 NaOH   →   2 Na3PO2S2  +  H2S  +  2 H2O
2 Na3PO2S2  +  3 BaCl2   →   2 Ba3(PO2S2)2  +  6 NaCl

In a second stage, the barium salt is decomposed with sulfuric acid, precipitating barium sulfate and liberating free dithiophosphoric acid:
Ba3(PO2S2)2  +  3 H2SO4   →   BaSO4  +  2 H3PO2S2

Under controlled conditions, dithiophosphoric acid hydrolyses to give the monothioderivative:

H3PO2S2  +  H2O   →   H3PO3S  +  H2S

References

Phosphorothioates
Acids